Leopold II (1050 – 12 October 1095), known as Leopold the Fair, a member of the House of Babenberg, was Margrave of Austria from 1075 until his death. A supporter of the Gregorian Reforms, he was one of the main opponents of the German king Henry IV during the Investiture Controversy.

Biography
Leopold the Fair was born in 1050, the son of Margrave Ernest of Austria and his wife Adelaide of Eilenburg, the daughter of the Wettin margrave Dedi I of Lusatia. His Babenberg ancestors had ruled the Margraviate of Austria since the appointment of Leopold's great-grandfather Leopold I in 976.

Leopold II succeeded as margrave upon his father's death in June 1075, at the time when the Investiture Dispute broke out between King Henry IV and Pope Gregory VII. He first sided with the German monarch and stayed at his court even after Henry's Walk to Canossa in January 1077. However, he switched sides under the influence of his wife Ida and Bishop Altmann of Passau, a loyal supporter of Pope Gregory who was expelled from his diocese by Henry's forces in 1078. Altmann fled to Austria and Margrave Leopold had to face an invasion by royal troops the next year, which led to the final break with the king.

In summer 1081, while King Henry IV was on campaign in Italy, Leopold backed the election of anti-king Count Hermann of Salm and convened an Austrian diet at Tulln where he officially dissociated from Henry. Subsequently, he was declared deposed by the king, who gave the Imperial fief to his loyal supporter Duke Vratislav II of Bohemia. The Přemyslid duke invaded Austria and defeated Leopold in the 1082 Battle of Mailberg, from where the margrave narrowly escaped with his life. Ultimately, however, he managed to retain his position, while Vratislav was elevated to a King of Bohemia in 1085. Leopold lost some territory in Southern Moravia north of the Thaya river, ruled by Prince Luitpold of Znojmo, who was, nevertheless, his son-in-law. 

While Bishop Altmann of Passau stayed in Austria, the margraviate obtained a leading position in promoting the Gregorian Reforms, overruling the concept of proprietary churches and marriages of priests. Altmann introduced the Cluniac oberservance to Kremsmünster Abbey and in 1083 established the Augustinian monastery of Göttweig near Krems. In 1089 Margrave Leopold helped pay for the construction of Melk Abbey in the Wachau region by donating extended premises high above the shore of the Danube for the new monastery.

Marriage and children
In 1065 Leopold married Ida (1055–1101), a Bavarian countess of Formbach (Vornbach). Ida was the daughter of Count Rapoto IV and Matilda and a relative of Archbishop Thiemo of Salzburg. She is said to have died during the Crusade of 1101. Leopold and Ida had a son:
Leopold III (1073–1136), who succeeded his father as Austrian margrave,
as well as six daughters:
Adelaide (d. after 1120), married Count Theoderic II of Formbach
Elizabeth (d. 1107), married Margrave Ottokar II of Styria
Gerberga (d. 1142), married Duke Bořivoj II of Bohemia
Ida, married the Přemyslid prince Luitpold of Znojmo
Euphemia, married Count Conrad I of Peilstein
Sophia (d. 1154), married Henry of Eppenstein, Duke of Carinthia from 1090 to 1122, and secondly Count Sieghard X of Burghausen.

References
Citations

Bibliography

External links

 Leopold II. Liutpold, Babenberger-Markgraf at AEIOU

1050 births
1095 deaths
11th-century margraves of Austria